The 2019–20 CEV Cup was the 48th edition of the European CEV Cup volleyball club tournament. The tournament has been cancelled due to the COVID-19 pandemic.

Participating teams
The number of participants on the basis of ranking list for European Cup Competitions:

Main phase

16th finals

|}

First leg

|}

Second leg

|}

8th finals

|}
Notes

First leg

|}

Second leg

|}

4th finals

|}

First leg

|}

Second leg

|}

Final phase

Semifinals

|}

First leg

|}

Second leg

|}

References

External links
 Official site 

CEV Cup
CEV Cup
CEV Cup
CEV Cup